Sunnybrooke is a commuter rail station operated by the Réseau de transport métropolitain (RTM) in the borough of Pierrefonds-Roxboro in Montreal, Quebec, Canada.

It was served by the Exo Deux-Montagnes line. On December 31, 2020, the Deux-Montagnes line closed permanently in favour of REM service, which will operate along the same route. Rail service at the station will resume with the opening of the Deux-Montagnes branch of the REM, expected in the fourth quarter of 2024.

History 

The station is located at 9670 Gouin Blvd. West, in Pierrefonds, Quebec.

The station takes its name from the nearby Boulevard Sunnybrooke, which crosses the railroad at the exit of the station.

From the opening of the Deux-Montagnes Line in 1918 until the modernization of the line, which took place between 1993 and 1995, the area was served by a nearby station called A-ma-Baie, located by Alexander Blvd; near Gouin Blvd. and buses.

Connecting bus routes

References

External links 
 Sunnybrooke Commuter Train Station Information (RTM)
 Sunnybrooke Commuter Train Station Schedule (RTM)
 2016 STM System Map

Former Exo commuter rail stations
Railway stations in Montreal
Pierrefonds-Roxboro
1994 establishments in Quebec
Railway stations in Canada opened in 1994
Réseau express métropolitain railway stations